The Purvis Eureka is a sports car which was produced by Purvis Cars at Dandenong in Victoria, Australia  from 1974 until 1991.

First exhibited at the 1974 Melbourne International Motor Show, the Eureka was based on the British Nova kit car design of 1971. It utilised a Volkswagen Beetle chassis, a fibreglass body  and, most commonly, an air-cooled Volkswagen flat-four or a Ford inline four-cylinder engine. Some cars with Mazda rotary powerplants were also produced. The Eureka was offered both as a kit car and as a fully assembled vehicle. The coupe body had no doors, with access being via a manually operated one-piece canopy, although a power-operated canopy was later offered as an option. A Targa top version was also available from the early 1980s on.

Three models of the Eureka were produced.
 Purvis Eureka Sports, from 1974 to 1975 
 Purvis Eureka PL30, from 1975 to 1976 
 Purvis Eureka F4, from 1976 to 1991 

Some 235 examples of the Eureka Sports were produced  and the total output of all Eureka models had reached 683 when production ended in 1991.

In  1977, Eureka Cars NZ, of Auckland, New Zealand, was set up to manufacture the Eureka in New Zealand. The number made by them is unknown but some still exist. The company closed in 1990.

References

External links 
 Purvis Eureka Car Club of Australia

Cars of Australia
Sports cars
Rear-engined vehicles
Cars introduced in 1974
1980s cars
1990s cars